is Morning Musume's 11th single, and was released December 13, 2000. It sold a total of 986,040 copies and peaked at number two on the Oricon Charts. The lead vocals of this single are Natsumi Abe and Maki Goto. This single also marks the last with Yuko Nakazawa before she graduated from Morning Musume to pursue her solo career within the Hello! Project. The dance appeared in the PV and their live performance was choreographed by Natsu Mayumi.

Members at the time of single 
1st generation: Yuko Nakazawa , Kaori Iida, Natsumi Abe
2nd generation: Kei Yasuda, Mari Yaguchi
3rd generation: Maki Goto
4th generation: Rika Ishikawa, Hitomi Yoshizawa, Nozomi Tsuji, Ai Kago

Track listing 
All lyrics are composed by Tsunku.
 
 
 "Ren'ai Revolution 21" (Instrumental)

Personnel 
 Tsunku – composer, background vocals
 Dance☆Man – arranger (track 1)
 Shunsuke Suzuki – arranger (track 2)
 Masahiro Kobayashi – horn arranger (track 2)

Other versions and covers
A "13-nin (13 people)" version of the song was rerecorded by the 2002 lineup with Ai Takahashi, Risa Niigaki, Makoto Ogawa and Asami Konno for the album 4th Ikimashoi!; the original single version appears on Best! Morning Musume 1 and All Singles Complete: 10th Anniversary; the updated version is sung by the current 2013 lineup in The Best! ~Updated Morning Musume~.

This song was covered by Taiwanese girl groups 4 in Love and Ice Creamusume, as well as Korean artist Hyun Young, and remixed by DJ Command feat. うさ＆ともみん in Beatmania IIDX 18 Resort Anthem. The song is also included as one of the 28 tracks in Just Dance Wii. There are two version for this song is called Futomen Revolution and Ramen Revolution. These two versions are used in the Nissin's Futomen Dodo commercials.

External links 
 Up-Front Works Official Website: CD entry, Vinyl LP entry

Morning Musume songs
Zetima Records singles
2000 singles
Song recordings produced by Tsunku
Japanese-language songs
2000 songs
Japanese synth-pop songs
Electronic dance music songs
Dance-pop songs
Songs written by Tsunku